Diplolepidini is one of the twelve tribes of the gall wasp family (Cynipidae) and contains two genera (Diplolepis and Liebelia) with nearly 60 species. All species induce galls on roses (Rosa) in which the larvae live and feed.

References 

Cynipidae
Hymenoptera tribes